Chris New (born 17 August 1981) is an English film and stage actor best known for his starring role in the 2011 film Weekend. New made his screen writing and directorial debut in 2013 with the short film Ticking. He co-wrote the 2014 independent film Chicken, and co-wrote and directed the 2014 independent film A Smallholding.

Biography and career
New was born and raised in Swindon, Wiltshire, United Kingdom, and comes from a working-class background. His father was a truck driver and his mother held various short-term jobs, and New has an older brother. According to his own account, New "ran away" from Swindon in order to attend the Royal Academy of Dramatic Art (RADA) in London. Living in London was a major change for him:
...coming from a place where nothing was happening, Swindon, to suddenly this massive place, London, where there were huge amounts of things happening[,] I think I just ran around going, "Oh my God, oh my God," like a kid in a toy shop. It was a big thing for me to meet people who weren't living purely a consumer experience, because in Swindon, people rightly or wrongly live a very normal life. They go to work, they buy nice things and have nice holidays and bring up their kids. Unfortunately, there's something wrong with me which means that doesn't work, and I came to London and met loads of people for whom that doesn't work, either—where money wasn't an issue, where possessions weren't an issue, a whole different code of beliefs and faiths.
New financed his education by soliciting small donations from hundreds of people he knew. While at RADA, New sang in Stephen Sondheim musical play Assassins (he has a tenor singing voice), and performed in Joe Orton play The Erpingham Camp as part of his A-levels in 2005. He graduated from the school in 2006.

Theatre work
New has extensive theatre credits. His first professional stage credit occurred just weeks after graduation, when he appeared in the summer of 2006 as Mosby in the Elizabethan-era play Arden of Faversham at the White Bear Theatre in London. A reviewer for The Stage remarked that he played the villainous role with "brooding menace". That December, he appeared as Horst opposite theatre veteran Alan Cumming in a production of Bent, by Martin Sherman, at Trafalgar Studios in London. Susannah Clapp, reviewing the play for The Observer, said New is "an actor whose huge talent is unusually matched by his restraint." His performance won him an Evening Standard Award nomination for the Milton Shulman Award for Outstanding Newcomer of 2006, and a What's On Stage.com Theatregoers' Choice Award nomination for Best London Newcomer of the Year for 2006.

In February 2007, New took on the role of Louis in The Reporter, a play by Nicholas Wright about the mysterious suicide of BBC journalist James Mossman in 1971. The play was produced by the Royal National Theatre at the Cottesloe Theatre in London. New starred opposite Ben Chaplin. David Benedict in Variety called New's Louis "nervy, charged-up but controlled", and said the "strain of the relationship's illegality creates the play's strongest sequence." Philip Fisher for The British Theatre Guide had equally good things to say, noting that "New, who received universal plaudits for his performance opposite Alan Cumming in Bent once again shows real talent as Louis."

In October 2007, New played Dromio of Ephesus in William Shakespeare The Comedy of Errors. The comedy was mounted by the Royal Shakespeare Company, and New was part of the national touring cast. The play marked New's Royal Shakespeare Company (RSC) debut.

When The Comedy of Errors neared the end of its tour, New took on the role of Viola in the RSC's production of William Shakespeare's Twelfth Night. The play is about a shipwrecked woman who adopts a male identity, only to discover her long-lost twin brother is also on the island. The Neil Bartlett production was a gender-bending one, in which the female roles were played by men, and the male roles by women. John Lithgow co-starred as Malvolio. Charles Spencer, writing for The Daily Telegraph, was harsh in his appraisal: "...in Chris New's performance, apart from an opening sequence in unconvincing drag, there is no attempt to capture Viola's femininity. He just comes over as a strangely charmless, somewhat priggish gay young man." Michael Billington in The Guardian had few good things to say about the production as a whole, but highly praised New's performance:
One idea that does pay off is the casting of a young male actor, Chris New, as Viola. Since the character spends much of the play in masculine attire as Cesario, our attention is constantly drawn to Viola's preoccupation with the sinfulness of disguise and the pathos of her situation. New, clad in an Edwardian cream-coloured suit, has an especially good moment when, in response to Olivia's enquiries about his origins, he pauses guiltily before announcing: "I am a gentleman." Caught in a gender trap of his own making, New artfully reminds us that everything Viola says about herself is in heavily inverted commas.
Other reviewers found both the production and New's performance outstanding. David Benedict, writing in Variety, said Bartlett brought a "mature emotional intelligence...to one of Shakespeare's most-produced plays", and found much to praise in New's characterization of Viola. The male-playing-female-playing male conceit, he said, relieves New "of the distracting business of allowing auds to see how well or ill he pulls off the task of female impersonation. This allows him much more room to explore depth of emotion in both guises, something he accomplishes with truly arresting poise." What's On Stage's anonymous reviewer also greatly enjoyed New's performance, noting: "Playing a woman who in turn plays a man, New is superbly deft and delicate, richly deserving of further accolades."

New subsequently starred as Simon Bliss in a July 2008 revival of Noël Coward 1924 comedy, Hay Fever at the Royal Exchange Theatre in Manchester, England. Critic Mark Powell wrote in Metro News that "It's hard to see how this reasonably plush production could have been cast much better as Belinda Lang and Chris New...arguably grate the most joyously as the passive-aggressive mother and son..." Alfred Hickling in The Guardian also enjoyed New's work, noting that he played Simon Bliss "like [an] overgrown toddler[] in evening wear", while Natalie Anglesey in The Stage praised his performance as "exuberant". In December 2008, New appeared as the college student Ricardo in the Young Vic production of Colin Teevan and Paul Heritage's play Amazonia.

In October 2009, New played Joe Orton in the original London production of the dark comedy Prick Up Your Ears, by Simon Bent. The concept for the play came from New's roommate. New contacted actor and comedian Matt Lucas, who was looking to do a play. Bent agreed to script the work, and Sonia Friedman came aboard as producer and Daniel Kramer as director.

On 23 and 24 April 2010 New joined a Young Vic production of the dance-play Pictures From an Exhibition (based on a musical suite by Modest Mussorgsky) at the Sadler's Wells Theatre in Islington, London. Due to the much larger stage at Sadler's Wells, the cast expanded from nine characters to 17. New joined the cast for the two days of performances at Salder's Wells. Reviewer Graham Watts noted that New blended with the original cast seamlessly, and called his performance "a very effective portrayal of Mussorgsky." New followed up playing selfish lover Steven in Peter Nichols new play Lingua Franca at the Finborough Theatre in London in July 2010. Critic Michael Billington praised New's casting.

In September 2011, New played the title role in Edward II by Christopher Marlowe at the Royal Exchange Theatre. Alfred Hickling had high praise for New's performance as Edward II, a decidedly non-sympathetic role. "Chris New's Edward earns pity, if not respect. His incessant vacillation is perfectly illustrated in the childish manner with which he folds his abdication papers into a crown, as if the realm of England were something that fell out of a cracker." David Chadderton, writing for The British Theatre Guide, found New equally praiseworthy: "The production is held together by a superb pairing of Chris New as Edward and Samuel Collings as Gaveston and later as the sinister murderer Lightborn. There is never any doubt about the sexual nature of their relationship and the bond feels genuine, and, while neither character is particularly attractive, they both have great charisma."

Interestingly, although New has not necessarily sought out gay-themed plays or characters, Ben Walker in Attitude magazine noted in 2011 that it's this work which has attracted the most acclaim.

New co-starred in a revival of Philip Ridley 1991 play The Pitchfork Disney in February 2012. The play ran at the Arcola Theatre in London. Lyn Gardner, critiquing the play for The Guardian, called New's one of several excellent performances in the play.

After an absence from the stage for nearly a year, New appeared in the Chris Dunkley play Smallholding at the Nuffield Theatre at the University of Southampton Highfield Campus. David Penrose, writing for the Portsmouth News, said that New and co-star Matti Houghton provided performances of "energy and great emotional weight. Both are charismatic, highly physical performers, being funny and manic." The HighTide Festival Theatre production then moved to the Soho Theatre in the City of Westminster, London, in January 2014.

In the summer of 2013, New directed the play The Precariat at the Finborough Theatre. New subsequently wrote the short play A New Play for the General Election in 2015. It debuted under his direction at the Finborough Theatre in April 2015 to mixed reviews.

New played the title role of Tom Wingfield in the Nottingham Playhouse production of Tennessee Williams' The Glass Menagerie in March 2016, for which he won raves from the Nottingham Post.

In 2017 New and Mark Edel-Hunt played Daniel Quinn in City of Glass, adapted by Duncan Macmillan from the first novel of Paul Auster’s New York Trilogy, and the graphic novel by Paul Karasik and David Mazzucchelli. The play had its premier in March at HOME in Manchester and continued at the Lyric Theatre in London in April. A cast of four adults and a child played sixteen parts and a narrator. "The ensemble […] are excellent", writes The Arts Desk.
The 59 Productions, Lyric Theatre, HOME and Karl Sydow production was nominated for the UK Theatre Awards 2017 design award.

In March 2017 New performed a reading of Tibor Fischer’s Portrait of the Artist as a Foaming Deathmonger.

New played the part of pilot Lars Koch in Ferdinand von Schirach’s courtroom drama Terror at the Brisbane Festival in September 2017. The Lyric Theatre production previously had its UK premier in June 2017, with a different cast. “Chris New as Lars Koch, the pilot, is stunningly adamant and fragile”, writes Meredith McLean in the AU review. "Chris New plays the dignified Koch with convincing restraint", says Jo Litson in Limelight magazine.

New returned to the Royal Shakespeare Company for the 2018 summer season. He played the Cardinal in a modern dress production of John Webster’s The Duchess of Malfi, directed by Maria Aberg, at the Swan Theatre in Stratford-upon-Avon. The RSC warned its audience stating: "Please note The Duchess of Malfi contains violence, scenes that some people may find distressing, and a lot of blood!"
The play opened to positive reviews.

Film work
New made his cinema acting debut alongside Tom Cullen in the romantic-drama film Weekend in 2011, a film directed by Andrew Haigh. Karen Durbin, writing for The New York Times, called New one of the "faces to watch" for his outstanding performance. His performance won him a nomination as Best Newcomer at the 2011 BFI London Film Festival Awards.

New was scheduled to voice the character of Gregor Samsa in the 2011 film Metamorphosis, based on the short story "The Metamorphosis", by Franz Kafka. For reasons which are unclear, the character was voiced by a different actor. (The film was finally released in 2012.)

New auditioned for the role of Jesus Christ for an American network in 2012, but did not get the part. New suspects he was turned down because of his sexuality, but cautioned, "There could be a million reasons why you might not get a job and gay people have to be careful about blaming [homophobia], because they're reinforcing their own closet door." In 2012, New and playwright Freddie Machin adapted Machin's play Chicken for the cinema. Television director Joe Stephenson and his production company, B Good Picture Company, picked up the script for filming in September 2012. New was cast alongside actor Scott Chambers and actress Yasmin Paige in the drama, which focuses on two brothers squatting on a piece of land who come into conflict with the new landowner. Scheduling conflicts forced New to drop out of the project as an actor. The film was released in 2015, and played several festivals before finding an international distributor.

New made his cinema directorial debut in April 2013 with the short film Ticking, which premiered at the Nashville Film Festival.

New returned to cinema in 2014, directing the micro-budget film A Smallholding. New had previously starred in the stage play of the same name by playwright Chris Dunkley. The film was produced by Man in Rum, and the budget was raised entirely on Kickstarter, a crowd-sourcing funding Web site. Principal photography on the film wrapped in early March 2014. New co-wrote the film with Dunkley, and also acted as its cinematographer, film editor, and sound editor.

Personal life
New is openly gay, having come out of the closet "professionally" in 2006. Worried about the impact of being known as a "gay actor" on his career, he discussed the issue with Bent co-star Alan Cumming (who has been open about his bisexuality for decades). After weighing the risks, New decided to come out as gay.

New says, however, that as an individual he has never been in the closet. He told Attitude magazine: "To understand the psychology of not necessarily wanting your sexuality to be a major part of you but having it made a major part of you by the people around you. All people talk about with me is, 'Are you out?' And yeah, I am, I always have been and I don't see a problem with that. I've never hidden it. My first agent tried to make me hide it so I fired her."

New entered into a civil partnership with graphic designer David "Dav" Watson in 2011.  This relationship ended in 2016.

New is a friend of actor Ian McKellen, and often helps McKellen learn scripts and run lines.

Filmography
 Weekend (2011; acting)
 Ticking (2013; producer, writer, director, editor)
 A Smallholding (2014; co-writer, director, cinematographer, editor, sound editor)
 Chicken (2015; co-writer)

See also

List of British actors
List of RADA alumni

References

External links

20th-century English male actors
1981 births
21st-century English male actors
Alumni of RADA
English male film actors
English male stage actors
English gay actors
Living people
21st-century LGBT people